Solis Planum is  a planum on Mars which has a diameter of 1811.23 km.  Its center latitude is 26.4 S and its center longitude is 270.33 E.  Solis Planum was named after a classic albedo feature name, and its name was approved in 1973.

Gallery

Interactive Mars map

References

See also
 Phoenicis Lacus quadrangle
 Volcanism on Mars

1973 in science
Coprates quadrangle
Phoenicis Lacus quadrangle
Plains on Mars
Thaumasia quadrangle